The shekel sign (₪) is a currency sign used for the Israeli new shekel, which is the currency of Israel.

Israeli new shekel (1986–present)
"New Shekel") or by the acronym  . The symbol was announced officially on 22 September 1985, when the first new shekel banknotes and coins were introduced. It is constructed by combining the two Hebrew letters that constitute the acronym (the first letter of each of the two words, Hebrew being written from right to left): "ש" and "ח". Sometimes the "₪" symbol (Unicode 20AA) is used following the number, other times the acronym .

The shekel sign, like the dollar sign ("$"), is usually placed left of the number (i.e. "₪12,000" and not "12,000₪"), but since Hebrew is written from right to left, this means that the symbol is actually written after the number. It is either not separated from the preceding number, or is separated only by a thin space.

Unlike the dollar sign, the new shekel sign is not used that often when handwriting monetary amounts.

The road sign announcing the entrance to an Israeli toll road, such as Highway 6 or the Carmel Tunnels, is a shekel symbol with a road in the background.

Unicode and input 
The symbol has the Unicode code point .  It has been in Unicode since June 1993, version 1.1.0.

The Shekel sign, however, is not engraved on most keyboards sold in Israel and the sign is rarely used in day-to-day typing.
 On systems with the Hebrew keyboard layout set, it can be typed on modern Microsoft Windows, desktop Linux and ChromeOS by using .
 On Mac OS X it can be typed as  when the system is set to a Hebrew keyboard layout.

Old Israeli shekel (1980–1985) 

The old Israeli shekel, "", in circulation between 1980 and 1985, had a different symbol, which was officially announced on 18 March 1980. Before the introduction of the old shekel in 1980, there was no special symbol for the Israeli currency. It was a stylized Shin shaped like a cradle (i.e. rounded and opening upward).    This symbol appeared on checks issued by Israeli banks between 1980 and 1985. Quoting prices in new shekels started officially on 1 January 1986, and the old shekel checks remaining unused had to be stamped with the new shekel symbol over the old symbol.

See also
 Israeli shekel
 Israeli agora
 Currency symbol

Notes

References

Symbols introduced in 1980
Symbols introduced in 1986
Currency symbols